Norwood is a surname. Notable people with the surname include:
Ceddaius Norwood, soon to be singer and or actor 
Brandy Norwood, American singer, songwriter, actress and model; daughter of Willie Norwood
Charlie Norwood (1941–2007), a United States Representative from Georgia
Cyril Norwood (1875–1956), British educator
Daron Norwood (1965–2015), American country music singer
Eille Norwood, born Anthony Brett, (1861–1948), English playwright and actor known for playing Sherlock Holmes in films
Gabe Norwood (born 1985), Filipino-American professional basketball player
James Norwood (born 1990), English professional footballer
James Norwood (baseball) (born 1993), American professional baseball pitcher
Janet L. Norwood (1923–2015), American statistician
Jerious Norwood, American football player
John Norwood, English recipient of the Victoria Cross
Jordan Norwood, American football player
Lee Norwood, American ice hockey player
Melita Norwood, a British civil servant who provided the KGB with state secrets including the schematics for the British atomic bomb in 1945
Oliver Norwood (born 1991), Northern Ireland international footballer
Paula Norwood, American statistician
Richard Norwood, British mathematician, diver, and surveyor
Ricky Norwood, British actor
Robin Norwood (born 1945), American family therapist and author
Rose Finkelstein Norwood (1890–1980), American labor organizer
Scott Norwood, American football player
Thomas M. Norwood (1830–1913), a United States Senator and Representative from Georgia
Tre Norwood (born 1999), American football player
Virginia T. Norwood (born 1927), United States physicist
Willie Norwood (born 1955), American gospel singer; father of Brandy Norwood and Ray J
 William Ray Norwood Jr. (born 1981), American singer and actor known as Ray J; son of Willie Norwood